Union City station is a Bay Area Rapid Transit (BART) station in Union City, California. The station sits near Decoto Road east of Alvarado-Niles Road, directly behind the James Logan High School campus. Local bus service is provided by Union City Transit and AC Transit.

History 

Service at the station began on September 11, 1972. The fare lobby features tile mosaics designed by Jean Varda and constructed by Alfonso Pardiñas. Temporary parking spaces were constructed in 2006, and opened in the Summer of 2007. In May 2011, developers, Union City and BART officials unveiled the first residential housing project inside the city/transit agency-specified redevelopment district.

The station underwent construction through 2016 to create a second entrance on the other side of the station. The new eastern station entrance will entail remodeling of the station's platforms and lobby, new bus stop shelters will be built near the entrance, and a pedestrian bridge will be built to connect the East plaza, the opening of this phase will happen at a future date. The BART station building facade has been completely renovated and overhauled facelift which lends it an airy feeling similar to SFO station. Union City has invested $100 million into an expansion of the downtown district. The city is planning East of Bart Station on 7th and 11 streets, 1.2 million square feet of office space and 1,700 units are in the planning stages. The City expects the project will add 5,000 jobs and revenue. A commuter rail platform for existing Capitol Corridor and proposed Dumbarton Rail Corridor services was proposed in 2008. However, by 2019 the Capitol Corridor was planned to be rerouted over the operationally parallel Union Pacific Coast Line.

See also 
List of Bay Area Rapid Transit stations

References

External links 

BART – Union City Station

Bay Area Rapid Transit stations in Alameda County, California
Stations on the Orange Line (BART)
Stations on the Green Line (BART)
Railway stations in the United States opened in 1972
Bus stations in Alameda County, California
1972 establishments in California